Phil Stevens (born 14 September 1950) is a former Australian rules footballer who played with Geelong and St Kilda in the Victorian Football League (VFL).

Arriving from South Warrnambool, Stevens was just 17 when he first appeared for Geelong. Although he started out as a half forward flanker, Stevens would however develop into a half back flanker, which was from where he played most of his games. He represented the VFL on one occasion.

He was captain-coach of Sandringham in the 1982 VFA season.

Stevens was the general manager of the Victorian Amateur Football Association from 1989 to 2004 and is currently Operations Manager at VRA.

References

1950 births
Australian rules footballers from Victoria (Australia)
Geelong Football Club players
St Kilda Football Club players
South Warrnambool Football Club players
Sandringham Football Club players
Sandringham Football Club coaches
Living people